The 2002 WNBA Finals was the championship series of the 2002 WNBA season, and the conclusion of the season's playoffs. The Los Angeles Sparks, top-seeded champions of the Western Conference, defeated the New York Liberty, top-seeded champions of the Eastern Conference, two games to none in a best-of-three series. This was Los Angeles' second title.  

As of 2020, this is the last time a WNBA franchise has won back to back championships. Coincidentally 2 months before the finals, the Los Angeles Lakers of the NBA would win their 14th title by sweeping a New York Metro team, the New Jersey Nets 4-0.

The Liberty made their fourth appearance in the Finals in franchise history. The Sparks made their second straight Finals appearance.

The Sparks went into the series as defending champions.  2002 marked their second WNBA championship.  (The Houston Comets hold the record with four championships won.)

The Sparks had a 25–7 record (.781), good enough to receive home-court advantage over the Liberty (18–14).

To date, this is the last time the New York Liberty have reached the WNBA Finals.

Road to the finals

Regular season series
The teams had split the regular season series:

Game summaries
All times listed below are Eastern Daylight Time.

Game 1

Game 2

Nikki Teasley hit a series-winning three pointer with 2.1 seconds left. Teresa Weatherspoon tried to repeat history by trying to make a halfcourt heave at the buzzer, but the shot was blocked, and the Sparks won their second consecutive title.

Awards
2002 WNBA Champion: Los Angeles Sparks	
Finals MVP: Lisa Leslie

Rosters
{| class="toccolours" style="font-size: 95%; width: 100%;"
|-
! colspan="2" style="background-color: #5c2f83; color: #FFC322; text-align: center;" | 2002 Los Angeles Sparks Finals roster
|- style="background-color: #FFC322;color: #FFFFFF; text-align: center;"
! Players !! Coaches
|-
| valign="top" |
{| class="sortable" style="background:transparent; margin:0px; width:100%;"
! Pos. !! # !! Nat. !! Name !! Height !! Weight !!class="unsortable"| !! From
|-

{| class="toccolours" style="font-size: 95%; width: 100%;"
|-
! colspan="2" style="background-color: #0047AB; color: #FFFFFF; text-align: center;" | 2002 New York Liberty Finals roster
|- style="background-color: #66CDAA;color: #FF4500; text-align: center;"
! Players !! Coaches
|-
| valign="top" |
{| class="sortable" style="background:transparent; margin:0px; width:100%;"
! Pos. !! # !! Nat. !! Name !! Height !! Weight !!class="unsortable"| !! From
|-

Finals
Los Angeles Sparks
New York Liberty
WNBA Finals
WNBA Finals
Women's National Basketball Association Finals
WNBA Finals
Basketball competitions in Los Angeles
Basketball competitions in New York City
WNBA Finals
2000s in Manhattan